Further is the ninth studio album by English singer-songwriter Richard Hawley. It was released on 31 May 2019 by BMG Rights Management. The album is the first by Hawley not to be named after a location or landmark in his local city of Sheffield.

Critical reception

Reviews of Further were generally positive. Guy Oddy of The Arts Desk described the record as "Roy Orbison fronting Phil Spector's famous Wall of Sound", and stated that "while Richard Hawley has little to say about the stuff that causes a stir in the media, there is plenty about the things that everyone comes across while drifting into middle age and realising that youthful vitality is no longer powering life – and that’s pretty universal". The Guardians Dave Simpson observed that Hawley "seems to forever find unexpected new themes to inspire him" and that "Hawley certainly isn't tearing up the blueprint, but within the boundaries of his domain, nobody does it better".

Track listing

Charts

References

2019 albums
BMG Rights Management albums
Richard Hawley albums